Juan José Omella y Omella (also Joan Josep; born 21 April 1946) is a Spanish prelate of the Catholic Church. He has been the Archbishop of Barcelona since the end of 2015, a cardinal since 28 June 2017, and president of the Episcopal Conference of Spain since 3 March 2020.

Biography 
Omella was born in the village of Cretas in the Catalan-speaking part of Aragon. One of his sisters still lives there, while the other died at a young age.

The village priest convinced him to enter the seminary of Zaragoza. He studied at education centres for missionaries in Leuven and Jerusalem as well. On 20 September 1970 he was ordained a priest. He then worked for the church in Zaragoza and in Zaire.

Pope John Paul II appointed him auxiliary bishop of Zaragoza on 15 July 1996 and he was consecrated a bishop on 22 September by Elías Yanes Alvarez, Archbishop of Zaragoza.

John Paul II named him bishop of Barbastro-Monzón in 1999. He held the posts of Apostolic Administrator of Huesca and of Jaca from 2001 to 2003. In 2004 he was named bishop of Calahorra and La Calzada-Logroño.

He has been a member of the Commission of Social Ministry of the Spanish Episcopal Conference since 1996 and president of that commission from 2002 to 2008 and from 2014 to 2017. On 6 November 2014, Pope Francis appointed him a member of the Congregation for Bishops. According to El Periodico, Omella engineered the November 2014 early retirement of Manuel Ureña Pastor as Archbishop of Zaragoza, whom the local press later reported had mishandled a charge of harassment against one of his priests.

On 6 November 2015, Pope Francis appointed Omella Archbishop of Barcelona. He was installed there on 26 December.

On 21 May 2017, Pope Francis announced plans to make him a cardinal at a consistory scheduled for 28 June 2017. El Diario said the appointment made clear that Pope Francis's preferred representatives in Spain were Omella and Carlos Osoro, the Archbishop of Madrid whom Francis made a cardinal in 2016, and not the recently elected leadership of the Spanish Episcopal Conference, perceived as more conservative. It noted that Omella's appointment to the Congregation for Bishops positioned him to influence the future of church leadership in Spain. The consistory was held on 28 June as scheduled. He was created as the Cardinal-Priest of Santa Croce in Gerusalemme.

Following the Catalan independence referendum in 2017 the Catalan government suggested that Omella and the Abbot of Montserrat should act as mediators between the region and Spanish authorities.

Francis made him a member of the Congregation for Bishops and of the Supreme Tribunal of the Apostolic Signatura on 23 December 2017.

Omella is the co-author, with Miguel Pothoes Mombiela and José María Navarro, of La aurora de Calanda, una antigua institución, published in 1991.

On 7 March 2023, Pope Francis appointed him to the Council of Cardinal Advisors.

Notes

References

External links
 
 
 

1946 births
Living people
People from the Province of Teruel
21st-century Spanish cardinals
Cardinals created by Pope Francis
Archbishops of Barcelona
Bishops appointed by Pope John Paul II